The Russian Open Golf Championship (Senior) is a men's golf tournament on the European Senior Tour. It was first held in 2008, as the Russian Seniors Open, at the Pestovo Golf and Yacht Club. In 2013, after a four-year gap, it moved to Moscow Country Club, Nakhabino. It was played in 2013 and 2014 and then revived in 2018.

Winners

External links
Coverage on the European Senior Tour's official site

European Senior Tour events
Golf tournaments in Russia
Recurring sporting events established in 2008
2008 establishments in Russia